JTS Topology Suite (Java Topology Suite) is an open-source Java software library that provides an object model for Euclidean planar linear geometry together with a set of fundamental geometric functions.  JTS is primarily intended to be used as a core component of vector-based geomatics software such as geographical information systems.  It can also be used as a general-purpose library providing algorithms in computational geometry.

JTS implements the geometry model and API defined in the OpenGIS Consortium Simple Features Specification for SQL.
JTS defines a standards-compliant geometry system for building spatial applications; examples include viewers, spatial query processors, and tools for performing data validation, cleaning and integration.

In addition to the Java library, the foundations of JTS and selected functions are maintained in a C++ port, for use in C-style linking on all major operating systems, in the form of the GEOS software library.

Up to JTS 1.14, and the GEOS port, are published under the GNU Lesser General Public License (LGPL).

With the LocationTech adoption future releases will be under the EPL/BSD licenses.

Scope 

JTS provides the following functionality:

Geometry model 
Geometry classes support modelling points, linestrings, polygons, and collections.  Geometries are linear, in the sense that boundaries are implicitly defined by linear interpolation between vertices. Geometries are embedded in the 2-dimensional Euclidean plane.  Geometry vertices may also carry a Z value.

User-defined precision models are supported for geometry coordinates.  Computation is performed using algorithms which provide robust geometric computation under all precision models.

Geometric functions 
 Topological validity checking
 Area and Distance functions
 Spatial Predicates based on the Egenhofer DE-9IM model
 Overlay functions (including intersection, difference, union, symmetric difference)
 Buffer computation (including different cap and join types)
 Convex hull
 Geometric simplification including the Douglas–Peucker algorithm
 Geometric densification
 Linear referencing
 Precision reduction
 Delaunay triangulation and constrained Delaunay triangulation
 Voronoi diagram generation
 Smallest enclosing rectangle
 Discrete Hausdorff distance

Spatial structures and algorithms 
 Robust line segment intersection
 Efficient line arrangement intersection
 Efficient point in polygon
 Spatial index structures including quadtree and STR-tree
 Planar graph structures and algorithms

I/O capabilities 
 Reading and writing of WKT, WKB and GML formats

History 
Funding for the initial work on JTS was obtained in the Fall 2000 from GeoConnections and the Government of British Columbia, based on a proposal put forward by Mark Sondheim and David Skea. The work was carried out by Martin Davis (software design and lead developer) and Jonathan Aquino (developer), both of Vivid Solutions at the time. Since then JTS has been maintained as an independent software project by Martin Davis.

Since late 2016/early 2017 JTS has been adopted by LocationTech.

Projects using JTS 
 GeoServer
 GeoTools
 OpenJUMP and forks
 uDig
 gvSIG
 Batik
 Geoforge
 Hibernate Spatial
 Whitebox Geospatial Analysis Tools
 ODL Studio
 jts-discretizer
 orbis gis/h2gis
 Geophile

Platforms 
JTS is developed under the Java JDK 1.4 platform.  It is 100% pure Java. It will run on all more recent JDKs as well.

JTS has been ported to the .NET Framework as the Net Topology Suite.

A JTS subset has been ported to C++, with entry points declared as C interfaces, as the GEOS library.

C/C++ port: GEOS  

GEOS is the C/C++ port of a subset of JTS and selected functions. It is a foundation component in a software ecosystem of native, compiled executable binaries on Linux, Mac and Windows platforms. Due to the runtime construction of Java and the Java Virtual Machine (JVM), code libraries that are written in Java are basically not usable as libraries from a standardized cross-linking environment (often built from C). Linux, Microsoft Windows and the BSD family, including Mac OSX, use a linking structure that enables libraries from various languages to be integrated (linked) into a native runtime executable. Java, by design, does not participate in this interoperability without unusual measures (JNI).

Applications using GEOS 
GEOS links and ships internally in popular applications listed below; and, by delineating and implementing standards-based geometry classes available to GDAL, which in turn is a widely supported inner-engine in GIS, GEOS becomes a core geometry implementation in even more applications:

 GDAL - OGR - raster and vector data munging
 QGIS - Desktop cross-platform, open source GIS
 PostGIS - spatial types and operations for PostgreSQL
 GeoDjango – Django's support for GIS-enabled databases
 Google Earth – A virtual globe and world imaging program
 GRASS GIS Library and Application
 MapServer - an open source development environment for building spatially enabled internet applications
 World Wind Java – NASA's open source virtual globe and world imaging technology
 Orfeo toolbox – A satellite image processing library
 R – Open source statistical software with extensions for spatial data analysis.
 SAGA GIS A cross-platform open source GIS software

See also 
 DE-9IM, a topological model
 Geospatial topology

References

External links 
 
 Net Topology Suite Home page
 GEOS Home page

Geometric algorithms
Application programming interfaces
Free software programmed in Java (programming language)
Geographic data and information software
Geometric topology